Helen Walsh Longley (April 11, 1922 – September 13, 2005) was the former First Lady of Maine from 1975 to 1979, and the wife of the U.S. first independent Governor, James B. Longley.
 Longley was born Helen Angela Walsh in Springfield, Ohio. She met her future husband, then a cadet in the United States Army Air Corps, in 1943. The couple married in 1949 in Ohio and moved to Lewiston, Maine. They had five children, including former Republican U.S. Representative James B. Longley Jr. (born 1951).

As First Lady, Longley was a proponent of the Special Olympics, as well as state medical facilities, including the Maine Medical Center and Mercy Hospital.

Helen Longley died at Mercy Hospital in Portland, Maine, on September 13, 2005, at the age of 83. She was a resident of Falmouth, Maine, and a former resident of Lewiston.

References

External links
Bangor Daily News:Helen W. Longley

1922 births
2005 deaths
First Ladies and Gentlemen of Maine
People from Lewiston, Maine
People from Falmouth, Maine
People from Springfield, Ohio
Women in Maine politics
20th-century American women
20th-century American people
21st-century American women